N67 may refer to:

Roads 
 N67 road (Ireland)
 Bay–Calauan–San Pablo Road, in the Philippines
 Nebraska Highway 67, in the United States

Other uses 
 N67 (Long Island bus)
 Escadrille N67, a unit of the French Air Force
 , a submarine of the Royal Navy